Ingenio Quisqueya Airport is located in Quisqueya, San Pedro de Macorís, Dominican Republic. Another runway in San Pedro, it is utilized for private and sport aviation.
When it was inaugurated, it served as a cargo airport for the Ingenio Quisqueya, hence the name.

See also
Cueva Las Maravillas Airport

Sources
Airports DR

Airports in the Dominican Republic
Buildings and structures in San Pedro de Macorís Province